Frederic Tudor (September 4, 1783 – February 6, 1864) was an American businessman and merchant. Known as Boston's "Ice King", he was the founder of the Tudor Ice Company and a pioneer of the international ice trade in the early 19th century. He made a fortune shipping ice cut from New England ponds to ports in the Caribbean, Europe, and as far away as India and Hong Kong.

Career and family

Tudor was the third son of William Tudor, a wealthy Boston lawyer, and Delia Jarvis Tudor. Although his older brother William Tudor (1779–1830) would become one of Boston's leading literary figures, Tudor spurned the chance to be educated at Harvard and from the age of 13 occupied himself with business. After a visit to the Caribbean, he decided he could make a fortune exporting ice from the ponds of Massachusetts.

In 1806 (age 23), Tudor bought his first brig, Favorite, to carry ice cut from his father's farm in Saugus  from Charlestown to Martinique. It left dock on February 10, 1806, to the following report in the Boston Gazette: "No joke. A vessel has cleared at the Custom House for Martinique with a cargo of ice. We hope this will not prove a slippery speculation." While he secured a cargo of ice, a vessel in which to ship it, and formulated his plan of attack, he sent his brother William and his cousin, James Savage, ahead to obtain a monopoly from the various governments of the islands. "We wish you to procure from the gov' of Cuba a grant exclusive in which we offer you either to take a conces' of half or procure the privilege for us & we engage to pay you one thousand dollars with reasonable charges, in obtaining it you, however, to determine which you will do & write to that effect as early as possible." Although a considerable amount of the ice melted during the three-week journey south, he did manage to sell much of what remained on board for a loss of $4,500 overall. However, in the subsequent year, Tudor had severe financial losses when three shipments to Havana in the brig Trident also resulted in a loss.

A few factors were in Tudor's favor. Hiring ships was cheap because many left Boston empty to collect cargo later in the West Indies. Ice was free, only the labor of cutting it needed payment. Sawdust was also free as a waste product of the lumber industry, and insulated ice effectively.
Tudor had his first profits in 1810 when his gross sales amounted to about $7,400, then increasing to just short of $9,000; but of that, he only received $1,000 due to the "villainous conduct" of his agent. At this point, his personal debts far outweighed his income and he spent parts of 1812 and 1813 in debtor's prison. By 1815, however, he had managed to borrow $2,100, both to buy ice and to pay for a new ice-house in Havana. It was a double-shelled structure, twenty-five feet square on its outside dimension, nineteen feet square on the interior, and sixteen feet high, holding some 150 tons of ice. "Pursued by sheriffs to the very wharf," in Boston, Tudor set sail for Havana on November 1, 1815.

By 1816, Tudor was shipping ice from Massachusetts to Cuba with ever-increasing efficiency and decided to try his hand at importing Cuban fruit to New York. In August of that year, he borrowed $3,000 (at 40% interest) for a shipload of limes, oranges, bananas, and pears, preserving it with 15 tons of ice and 3 tons of hay. The experiment ended in disaster as virtually all the fruit rotted during the month-long voyage, leaving Tudor with several thousand dollars' worth of new debt. Still, he pressed on, opening up new markets in three southern U.S. cities (Charleston, South Carolina; Savannah, Georgia; and New Orleans, Louisiana).

Tudor spent the next few years experimenting with various kinds of insulation. Ice was packed aboard ship with wood shavings, sawdust, or rice chaff on its outside surfaces to insulate it against heat. The blocks were also stacked together like well-fitted masonry. He constructed icehouses throughout the tropics and created a demand there for cold refreshments.

By 1825, Tudor was doing well with ice sales, but the difficulty of hand-cutting large blocks limited his company's growth. However, one supplier, Nathaniel Jarvis Wyeth, harnessed horses to a metal blade to cut ice. Wyeth's ice plow made mass production a reality and allowed Tudor to more than triple his production.

On May 12, 1833 the brig Tuscany sailed from Boston for Calcutta, its hold filled with 180 tons of ice cut during the winter. When it approached the Ganges in September 1833, many believed the delivery was an elaborate joke, but the ship still had 100 tons of ice upon arrival. Over the next 20 years, Calcutta would become Tudor's most lucrative destination, yielding an estimated $220,000 in profits. Tudor had three ice houses built in India for storage, in Calcutta, Bombay, and Madras.

In the early 1830s, Tudor had also begun to speculate in coffee futures with his ice business as collateral. Initially, coffee prices did rise and Tudor made millions of dollars, but in 1834, Tudor fell more than a quarter-million dollars in debt, forcing him to re-focus on the ice trade. By the end of the year, Tudor wrote that 1834 had been unsatisfactory in all but one aspect – that of his marriage to a girl 30 years his junior.

In the summer of 1833, at the age of 50, Frederic had turned his attentions to 19-year-old Euphemia Fenno, who met him while she was visiting Boston from Mount Upton, New York. He began writing to her regularly, with the result that Frederic and Euphemia were married on January 2, 1834. The couple went on to have six children. By then the ice business had expanded from New York up through Maine.

The horse-drawn Charlestown Branch Railroad expanded to connect the Fresh Pond icehouses of Tudor, Addison Gage, and Nathaniel J. Wyeth with several wharves in Charlestown. Tudor Wharf is so named because it is where his ships departed. With the first ice shipment in December 1841, it made the process of transporting ice to ships considerably more efficient. By the 1840s, ice was being shipped all over the world; in 1845 an ice house was opened in Hong Kong, although it only remained open until 1850.  Although Tudor was now just a small part of the trade, his profits allowed him to pay off his debts and resume living a comfortable existence.

Tudor family and Nahant 

The Tudors belonged to a prominent Boston Brahmin family, and Frederic inherited his family's grounds in Nahant, Massachusetts. In 1825, after constructing his summer cottage in the center of town, he began a lifelong campaign to plant trees on treeless Nahant. By 1832 he had 3,358 trees growing in his nursery and within two years he had some 4,000 trees in cultivation, offering them to summer residents for free if they would plant them on their properties. The family grounds are now the Nahant Country Club.

Frederic married Euphemia Fenno (April 6, 1814, Mount Upton, New York– March 9, 1884, Newbury, Vermont). His oldest son, Frederic (February 11, 1845 – Boston 1902), was an 1867 graduate of Harvard College and a member of one of the first graduating classes at St. Paul's School (Concord, New Hampshire). The Ice King's second son, William, was also a graduate of St. Paul's School.

The younger Frederic was the grandfather of the 20th-century watercolorist and book illustrator Tasha Tudor (Frederic's daughter Rosamond married William Starling Burgess). She was born in Boston in 1915 and was named Starling Burgess for her father. He later re-christened her Natasha, after the character in "War and Peace." That name was later shortened to Tasha, and she published under that name.

Death
Frederic Tudor died in Boston at his house on the northwest corner of Beacon and Joy Streets on Saturday, February 6, 1864. He was buried in the King's Chapel cemetery on Tremont Street in the Tudor family tomb (number thirteen), but his remains may later have been moved.

References

Further reading 

 Cummings, Richard O. (1949). The American Ice Harvests: A Historical Study in Technology, 1800–1918. Berkeley and Los Angeles: California University Press. OCLC 574420883.
{{cite book |title=The Ice King: Frederic Tudor and His Circle, |author1=Carl Seaburg |author2=Stanley Paterson |editor= Alan Seaburg |publisher=Massachusetts Historical Society, Boston, and Mystic Seaport, Mystic, Connecticut |year=2003 |isbn=978-0939510801}}
 The Frozen-Water Trade: A True Story, Gavin Weightman, Hyperion, 2003, 247 pp.
 
 Ice House and Ice Industry Bibliography 

 External links 
 Ice Trade, 2003 NPR segment, featuring Gavin Weightman, author of The Frozen Water Trade''
 "Cool Customer: Frederic Tudor and the Frozen Water Trade" - Failure Magazine, April 2003
  "2004 National History Day 1st Place Documentary: Frederic Tudor and the Massachusetts Ice Exchange" - 10 min. award-winning video, by Robert Griffin, Nick Hamlin, Eric Lundquist
 The Ice Trade between America and India, from The Mechanics' Magazine (1836)
 Varnam post on The Forgotten American Ice Trade - Indian perspective on the ice trade with Calcutta
 Indian perspective on the ice trade, and links - Maddy's Ramblings
 How ice came to India, 1833
 American Heritage Magazine article on the ice trade - Compiled from archival sources
 Jamaica Pond Ice Houses and Trade
 Map of ice houses along the Kennebec River, 1891 - Maine Memory Network
 White Gold, Maine Public Broadcasting 5:16 min. video segment on ice industry
 Tudor Company Records at Baker Library Historical Collections, Harvard Business School.
 Frederic Tudor / Ice King / Taken from the Proceedings of the Massachusetts Historical Society, November, 1933

American merchants
Businesspeople from Boston
Ice trade
1783 births
1864 deaths
19th-century American businesspeople